Linda Mae Miller (née Gleason; born September 16, 1942) is an American film, stage, and television actress. The daughter of actor and comedian Jackie Gleason and the mother of actor Jason Patric, Miller began working professionally as a child, later appearing on Broadway in a production of Black Picture Show (1975), for which she was nominated for a Tony Award for Best Supporting Actress. She would go on to star in television and in feature films such as the drama One Summer Love, and the horror film Alice, Sweet Alice (both 1976).

Life and career

Early life
Miller was born Linda Mae Gleason on September 16, 1942 in New York City, the second child of actor Jackie Gleason and dancer Genevieve Halford. She began working in commercials and local stage productions beginning at age nine. Through her father, she is of Irish ancestry. She has one older sister, Geraldine. Miller was raised Catholic by her parents; her mother was described by her sister as "more Catholic than the Pope."

Miller attended the Catholic University of America in Washington, D.C., where she met playwright Jason Miller, then a graduate student. The two were married in 1963, and gave birth to a son, actor Jason Patric, in 1966.

Film and stage career
Miller was nominated for a Tony Award for Best Featured Actress in 1975 for her role in the Broadway play Black Picture Show. She had a regular role in the 1983 TV series The Mississippi, and her film credits include roles in One Summer Love (1976), Alice, Sweet Alice (1976), An Unmarried Woman (1978), Night of the Juggler (1980) and 2 Little, 2 Late (1999). She also played Ann Beaulieu in the 1988 television movie adaptation of  Elvis and Me.

Personal life
From her marriage to playwright and actor Jason Miller, she has one son, actor Jason Patric.

Filmography

Film

Television

Stage credits

References

External links

1942 births
Actresses from New York City
American film actresses
American stage actresses
American television actresses
American people of Irish descent
American Roman Catholics
Catholic University of America alumni
Living people
21st-century American actresses